Gyakuten Kenji 2, also known as Ace Attorney Investigations 2, is an adventure video game developed by Capcom. It was released in Japan for the Nintendo DS in 2011 and for Android and iOS in 2017. It is the sixth entry in the Ace Attorney series, and a sequel to Ace Attorney Investigations: Miles Edgeworth (2009).

The game follows prosecutor Miles Edgeworth, detective Dick Gumshoe and the teenage thief Kay Faraday, who investigate five cases; they face off against judge Hakari Mikagami, a rival character who is part of a "prosecutor purge" that removes weaker prosecutors from duty. The gameplay is divided into two types of phases: investigations, where the player searches the crime scene for evidence and talks to witnesses, and rebuttals, where they aim to find contradictions in witnesses' testimonies using the evidence found during the investigations.

The development team, which included director Takeshi Yamazaki, producer Motohide Eshiro and character designer Tatsuro Iwamoto, created the game for the series' tenth anniversary and finalized its direction during a five-day stay in the Capcom Manor in 2010. The game took shorter than usual to create, as the developers had the original Ace Attorney Investigations to use as a base, leading to an increased focus on the game's story. Reviewers were positive about the game, citing its story and the new "logic chess" gameplay mechanic as highlights. Following the 2021 localizations of The Great Ace Attorney: Adventures and Resolve, it remains the only Ace Attorney game to not have seen an official English release, although a fan translation was released in 2014; video game publications have commented on the lack of an English release and included it on lists of games they wanted to see localized.

Gameplay

Ace Attorney Investigations 2 is an adventure game in which players control prosecutor Miles Edgeworth, who investigates five cases; in one of the cases, the player also controls Edgeworth's father Gregory. The gameplay is mostly the same as in the previous game, Ace Attorney Investigations: Miles Edgeworth, and is divided into two types of phases: investigations and rebuttals.

During the investigations, the player controls Edgeworth directly; they search the crime scene for evidence, and talk to witnesses to learn new information. As the player investigates, observed information is saved as Edgeworth's thoughts; by combining these, the player can obtain further information that would otherwise remain hidden. At some points, the player can use a device called "Little Thief" to generate hologram reproductions of the crime scene using known information about it; the player can walk around in the recreations and point out inconsistencies with the evidence, and update the recreation accordingly. Sometimes the player is able to switch back and forth between recreations of the crime scene at two different times.

A new gameplay mechanic, "logic chess", is used during investigations when a character refuses to testify. The player interrogates them, which is visualized as a game of chess, with the player aiming to destroy the other character's chess pieces. To do this, they need to build up their advantage in the discussion by alternating between speaking and listening; when the player believes they have the advantage, they can choose to go on the offensive. The logic chess sections are timed, with the player having to make decisions before the timer bar has decreased all the way. The player takes damage if they make wrong choices, and the logic chess opponents get more difficult throughout the game.

After obtaining sufficient information and evidence from the investigation, the player confronts other characters and reads through their testimonies of the events in the case. The player can choose to press the character for more information on their statements, aiming to discover contradictions between the testimony and the evidence; if they find one, they can choose to present collected evidence from the investigations to point out the contradiction.

Synopsis

Characters and setting
Ace Attorney Investigations 2 takes place eight days after Ace Attorney Investigations, and features the same three main characters: prosecutor Miles Edgeworth; detective Dick Gumshoe; and teenage thief Kay Faraday. A new judge, Hakari Mikagami, serves as Edgeworth's rival; she is part of the "Prosecutorial Investigation Committee", which follows the actions of potentially troublesome and corrupt prosecutors to justify removing them from duty.

Plot
The first episode, "Turnabout Target", opens with an assassination attempt on Zheng Fa president Teikun Ō; he survives, but he later finds his head bodyguard, Gai Tojiro, dead. Asked by the Chief Prosecutor to investigate, and in the process getting involved with the infamous assassin Shelly de Killer, Edgeworth discovers that Tojiro's second-in-command Manosuke Naitō had killed Tojiro to replace him as the head bodyguard and that the assassination attempt was staged by the president to reverse his declining popularity.

In the second episode, "The Imprisoned Turnabout", Naitō is found dead in prison. Naitō's friend Sōta Sarushiro is suspected of murder, but Edgeworth's attempt to investigate is stymied when Judge Mikagami assigns prosecutor Yumihiko Ichiyanagi to the case in Edgeworth's place. To investigate, Edgeworth teams up with Tateyuki Shigaraki, a defense attorney and former protégé of Edgeworth's father Gregory. They suspect several inmates, including the assassin Ryōken Hōinbō, but it turns out that prison warden Marī Miwa killed Naitō, believing that Hōinbō had sent him to kill her. Sarushiro is freed, but Mikagami warns Edgeworth that he could lose his prosecutor's badge if he keeps investigating cases he is not assigned to.

The third episode, "The Inherited Turnabout", takes up events eighteen years before the present, where Gregory and Shigaraki are called to defend Issei Tenkai from the charge of murdering fellow chef Isaku Hyōdō. Because the body has disappeared, Gregory and prosecutor Manfred von Karma cannot make much progress, but von Karma coerces Tenkai into falsely confessing to being an accomplice. This leads to Gregory accusing von Karma of forging evidence, resulting in the infamous DL-6 Incident. In the present, chef Yutaka Kazami is almost killed in an art gallery run by Tenkai's assistant Tsukasa Oyashiki. Yumihiko is assigned to prosecute under Mikagami's direction, but Edgeworth still investigates. He concludes that Oyashiki attempted to kill Kazami as a trap to reveal the real culprit; Oyashiki admits her guilt but accuses Kazami of being Hyōdō's murderer. Mistakenly believing that the statute of the limitations for the crime has expired, Kazami admits to murdering Hyōdō, who he had conspired with to cheat in a cooking contest, but had then been betrayed by. Kazami and Oyashiki are jailed, and Tenkai is freed.

In the fourth episode, "The Forgotten Turnabout", an amnesic Kay is accused of murdering defense attorney Tsubasa Kagome. Edgeworth is brought up before the Prosecutorial Investigation Committee, which threatens to take his badge if he becomes involved with Kay's case; Edgeworth voluntarily gives up his badge and continues to investigate with help from prosecutor Franziska von Karma. He discovers that someone has been auctioning off evidence from legal cases, and finds a recording indicating that Kagome's murderer had a burn mark on their chin. When Edgeworth is called to defend himself against the committee, Mikagami reveals Bansai Ichiyanagi, the head of the investigation committee and Yumihiko's father, as the auctioneer and the one responsible for legal corruption in his former position as chief prosecutor. Yumihiko then thoughtlessly mentions that Bansai has a burn mark on his chin, identifying him as Kagome's murderer. Kay then remembers being attacked by someone and Shelly de Killer reveals the concept of a mastermind to Edgeworth and Kay.

In the fifth episode, "The Grand Turnabout", president Teikun Ō is found dead, and Bansai attempts to rig Miwa's trial in her favor by manipulating Mikagami through the kidnapping of her adopted son, Shimon Aizawa. Edgeworth prevents this and investigates the murder, learning that Teikun Ō has been dead for twelve years: the person previously thought to be the president was a body double, who had hired Hōinbō to kill the president to take his place, and was helped by Miwa and Bansai to cover up the crime. Sarushiro is revealed to be Kazami's long lost son; as a child, he was abducted by Hyōdō to prevent Kazami from winning the cooking contest. Hyōdō forced his son, Naito, to dispose of Sarushiro, hence why Sarushiro had Naito killed. Hōinbō found Sarushiro and brought him to an orphanage; Sarushiro later saw Hōinbō kill Teikun Ō on behalf of the body double, Miwa and Bansai. They betrayed Hōinbō, but Sarushiro helped him escape; he later enacted his revenge on them, manipulating them into killing Naitō and Kagome and killing the body double. In addition, he was the one who attacked and framed Kay to ensure that Edgeworth got involved and exposed Bansai. Sarushiro is imprisoned afterwards. Edgeworth realized he had been like Sarushiro; both had lost their fathers, and the ability to believe in anything. Edgeworth had somebody, but Sarushiro had nobody to trust. After stating that he'll fight the contradictions in the law Edgeworth regains his position as a prosecutor.

Development and release

Ace Attorney Investigations 2 was produced by Motohide Eshiro and directed by Takeshi Yamazaki, and features character designs by Tatsuro Iwamoto and music by Noriyuki Iwadare. Takuro Fuse, who would later become the character designer and art director for Ace Attorney, was in charge of the game's event images, and the opening and ending sequences to the episodes. While the original Ace Attorney Investigations had taken longer than usual for an Ace Attorney game to develop due to its several new gameplay systems that had to be created from scratch, Ace Attorney Investigations 2 went faster due to it already having a base game to build upon, resulting in the developers being able to put more focus on the game's story. According to Eshiro and Yamazaki, one of the major changes compared to the first Ace Attorney Investigations was the addition of an interrogation game mechanic; they chose to present it metaphorically as a game of chess, which was Edgeworth's favorite game. Another such change was the graphical improvements to the game's sprites and background art.

In the summer of 2010, the development team spent five days and four nights in a place called the Capcom Manor to work on the game; this was inspired by the filmmaker Akira Kurosawa, who would gather scriptwriters in a hotel room to create the scripts for his films. During their stay in the manor, they discussed the game's plot and the new gameplay system, finalized the direction, and created rough sketches for most characters in the game. For the new character Hakari Mikagami, Iwamoto used a female saint as the main image for her design, and imagined her as being an older woman he could look up to. Another new character, Yumihiko Ichiyanagi, was Eshiro's favorite minor character in the series because of his character arc and how he grows throughout the game. The game was developed for the Ace Attorney series' tenth anniversary; because of this, several characters from previous games in the series made cameo appearances, including Frank Sahwit and Will Powers.

The game was first revealed in Famitsu in September 2010 and was showcased at the 2010 Tokyo Game Show. A Flash-based demo was released on the game's official website in 2010, and a Nintendo DS demo was distributed in 2011 through the Wii console, Nintendo Zone hotspots, and "DS Station" kiosks at retailers. The game was released by Capcom in Japan for the Nintendo DS on February 3, 2011, and for Android and iOS on December 21, 2017. The Nintendo DS version was released in several different editions: a standard edition, which only includes the game; a "collector's pack", which includes a copy of the game, an orchestral soundtrack CD by Iwadare, a DVD with footage from the game's appearance at Tokyo Game Show, and a booklet with a manga by Iwamoto; an "extended edition", which includes a copy of the game and a Miles Edgeworth figurine; and a "limited edition", which includes all the items from the other editions.

Localization 
In early 2011, Christian Svensson at Capcom said that there were no plans at the time to release Ace Attorney Investigations 2 in regions outside Japan, due to higher localization costs than estimated returns; according to Eshiro, however, the main reason for the lack of a localization was scheduling, as all the staff working on the game had disbanded and moved to different teams after finishing the game, and were unable to work on a localization. Svensson said that there was a possibility of a release on another platform, and that he would discuss ways for it to happen with Capcom's strategy and R&D teams. In December 2011, Capcom was still discussing internally how to address the Ace Attorney audience, with Svensson saying that there is potential to release Ace Attorney Investigations 2 as a downloadable digital title. The game's potential English release was still discussed internally at Capcom in March 2012, but in January 2013, Svensson said that while Ace Attorney Investigations 2 still was talked about at Capcom, all their Ace Attorney resources, especially ones related to localization, were focused on the then-upcoming Phoenix Wright: Ace Attorney – Dual Destinies.

An English fan translation of Ace Attorney Investigations 2, subtitled Prosecutor's Path, has been developed, and includes localized names for new characters in the style of Capcom's Ace Attorney localizations. The translation project was done on the Ace Attorney fan site Court-Records, where a user asked people who were interested in the project to send in applications, which had to be approved for them to become part of the project. Alexa Ray Corriea at Polygon described this approach as uncommon, with most fan translation projects letting anyone help if they want, but said that it made the project more professional. A patch translating the game's first two episodes was released in 2013, and a complete patch for the game was released in 2014. A final patch was released in 2015.

Reception

On its initial release week, Ace Attorney Investigations 2 was the top-selling game in Japan across all platforms, selling more than 132,000 units. This was lower than the first Ace Attorney Investigations, which sold 172,000 copies during its opening week. The Japanese sales tracker Media Create theorized that this was due to Ace Attorney Investigations 2 having less TV commercials than the first game, and a lower level of consumer recognition according to weekly recognition surveys. They also noted that marketing had been targeting women more than men, leading to an increased interest among women, but decreased interest both among men and overall. During the game's second week, it dropped to fourth place in the Japanese game sales charts, selling an additional 30,910 copies.

Reviewers at Famitsu liked the game's story, saying that the "turnabouts" that come from tense situations are exciting. They also liked the sense of urgency brought about with the logic chess, and called the game's use of sound effects excellent. AsbelGrants at Jeuxvideo.com called Ace Attorney Investigations 2 the best entry in the series, saying that the plot and characters were the game's highlights, keeping the player in suspense until the end. They found the first episode surprisingly strong, as it was a "long and exciting case" compared to other Ace Attorney games' tutorial-like first episodes. They noted how the gameplay was mostly the same as in Ace Attorney Investigations, but did not consider this a problem as they thought it had the best type of investigations in the series, and they enjoyed the implementation of the logic chess feature. They enjoyed the music, calling it memorable.

In 2011, Game Informer ranked the game as 8th on a list of the best video games that had not been released in North America; in 2015, they included it on a list of twelve video games they wanted to see localized, saying that it could possibly be released via the Nintendo eShop. In 2012, GamesRadar ranked it as 7th on a list of the top seven games that "absolutely need to be localized for the west". Rebecca Rudeen at NF Magazine called the lack of a localization unfortunate, saying that the game was a crucial part of Edgeworth's story. Tim Sheehy at Destructoid called the game promising, based on a demo available at Tokyo Game Show, saying that the demo left him wanting more. He wished that the voice acting from the game's trailer had been present within the game itself, but also said that the lack of voice acting would not keep him from wanting to play the game.

Notes

References

External links
  
 

Fan translation
2011 video games
Ace Attorney video games
Adventure games
Android (operating system) games
Capcom games
Interquel video games
IOS games
Japan-exclusive video games
Nintendo DS games
Video games developed in Japan
Video games scored by Noriyuki Iwadare
Video game prequels
Video game sequels
Visual novels
Video games set in 2000
Video games set in 2018
Single-player video games